Airport station is a station of Gwangju Metro Line 1 in Sinchon-dong, Gwangsan District, Gwangju, South Korea. The station serves Gwangju Airport, and there is a connection to the Kim Daejung Convention Center station via Gukrak Bridge Haje Tunnel.

Features
It is about 300m away from Gwangju Airport, so it is not far away, but the frequency of use is low, and after the opening of Gwangju Songjeong Station on the Honam High-Speed Rail, the demand has been distributed to Gwangju Songjeong Station operated by Gwangju Metro, and the utilization rate has been decreasing.

Station layout

External links
  Cyber station information from Gwangju Metropolitan Rapid Transit Corporation
  Cyber station information from Gwangju Metropolitan Rapid Transit Corporation

Gwangju Metro stations
Gwangsan District
Airport railway stations in South Korea
Railway stations opened in 2004